The 29th Alberta Legislative Assembly was constituted after the general election on May 5, 2015. The New Democrats, led by Rachel Notley, won a majority of seats and formed the government. The Wildrose Party, which won the second most seats, formed the official opposition until July 2017, when it merged with the Progressive Conservatives, to become the United Conservative Party, which then became the official opposition.

Membership in the 29th Alberta Legislative Assembly

Seating plan

As of July 2017

Official Seating Plan (Retrieved July 19, 2017)

As of March 14, 2018
The merger of the Wildrose and Progressive Conservatives in late July 2017 created the United Conservative caucus, which was recognized by the Speaker's office as the official opposition, among other changes to party affiliations. The seating plan was therefore altered for the fall sitting.

Official Seating Plan (Retrieved March 14, 2018)

By-elections to the 29th Legislative Assembly

Standings changes since the 29th general election

Notes and references

External links
 Alberta Legislative Assembly

29th Alberta Legislature
2015 in Canadian politics
2016 in Canadian politics
2017 in Canadian politics
2018 in Canadian politics
2019 in Canadian politics
Legislature, 29
Legislature, 29
Legislature, 29
Legislature, 29
Legislature, 29